2016 Czech Lion Awards ceremony was held on 5 March 2016. Petr Zelenka's Lost in Munich received highest number of nominations but won only two categories. The Snake Brothers has won 6 awards, including Best picture film.

Winners and nominees

Non-statutory Awards
 Best Film Poster
The Snake Brothers – Michal Tilsch
 Film Fans Award
The Snake Brothers
 Magnesie Award for Best Student Film
Peacock – Ondřej Hudeček

References

2015 film awards
Czech Lion Awards ceremonies